Firwood Park is a suburban area  of Chadderton in the Metropolitan Borough of Oldham, Greater Manchester.
It is located a little over one mile to the west of Chadderton's commercial centre on Middleton Road and is contiguous with the Mills Hill, Chadderton Park and Middleton Junction areas of the town. A development of 749 houses, Firwood Park was built in 1990 on a vast tract of land, which at one time was claimed to be the largest private residential development in Europe.

History
In 1844 James Cheetham built the Firwood Mill at the side of the Rochdale Canal close to Mills Hill.   His family lived at Firwood House which was set in its own grounds on the other side of the canal, close to the industrial hamlet of Drummer Hill. This house was demolished many decades ago but its name is perpetuated in the Firwood Park estate. Firwood Mill was demolished in 1960.

Transport
Stotts Tours (Oldham) operates service 396 to Middleton and to Ashton-under-Lyne via Chadderton town centre, Werneth and Bardsley. MT Travel operate service 406 to Oldham via Mills Hill, Chadderton Park and Coldhurst. On nearby Middleton Road First Greater Manchester provide the following bus services- 58 to Middleton and to Rochdale via Chadderton town centre, Oldham, Heyside, Shaw and Milnrow. 59 to Manchester city centre via Middleton and Cheetham Hill and to Rushcroft via 
Chadderton town centre, Oldham, Heyside and Shaw.

References

Areas of Chadderton